ACCHS may refer to:

 Aboriginal community-controlled health services, modelled on AMS Redfern in Sydney, Australia
 Allentown Central Catholic High School, located in Allentown, Pennsylvania
 Atchison County Community High School, located in Effingham, Kansas